Dragica (Cyrillic: Драгица) is a South Slavic feminine given name. 

Those bearing it include:
 Dragica Cepernić (1981— ), Croatian football player
 Dragica Džono (1987— ), Croatian handball player
 Dragica Đurić (1963— ), former Yugoslav handball player
 Dragica Kresoja (1986— ), Macedonian handball player
 Dragica Mitrova (1987— ), Macedonian handball player
 Dragica Sekulić (1980— ), Montenegrin politician

References

Slavic feminine given names
Croatian feminine given names
Serbian feminine given names